The preservational mode of the Doushantuo formation involves very early phosphatisation on a cellular level - with cells being replaced by phosphate before they degrade.

Occurrence
The mode of preservation is typically found in shallow, high energy waters, as lenses of phosphate in carbonate rocks. Its occurrence is assisted by high concentrations of phosphate, which are presumably led to precipitate around the degradation products of cells and cell walls.

What is preserved
Cells are preserved at a cellular level, with arguments that sub-cellular structures may even represent cell nuclei.

Bias
Although the preservational window is open pretty continually from about  through most of the Cambrian, it tends to preserve microscopic things, such as embryos and bacteria.

References

Doushantuo-type microfossils from latest Ediacaran phosphorites of northern Mongolia
Doushantuo embryos preserved inside diapause egg cysts
Three‐Dimensional Phosphatic Preservation Of Giant Acritarchs From The Terminal Proterozoic Doushantuo Formation In Guizhou And Hubei Provinces, South China

Cambrian fossil record
Fossilization